Welcome to Tomorrow is the third and final studio album from German Eurodance project Snap!. It was released in 1994 on Arista/Ariola Records and made the top ten in Germany and Switzerland.

Background
In 1993, Snap! producers Michael Münzing and Luca Anzilotti recruited Washington DC-born singer Summer to front the act. Summer was born Paula Brown and had previously worked as a dancer in the TV series Fame and in the Spike Lee film School Daze. Summer featured on six of the songs on the album.
The first single from the album was called "Welcome to Tomorrow (Are You Ready?)" and was co-written by Brown. The single was a top ten single in Germany, Netherlands, United Kingdom and was No.1 in Finland. Three further singles were released; "The First the Last Eternity (Till the End)", "The World in My Hands" and "Rame" featuring Neela Ravindra and Rukmani.

Critical reception 

Neil Spencer from The Observer wrote, "Silkier and more ambient than their string of Euro-dance hits, the German popsters' third album puts their futurist disco kitsch into mega-drive, with Bacofoil suits and android dreams."

Track listing 

Notes:
 Track 9: Made for an episode of Beverly Hills, 90210.
 Track 10: Made for the film "The NeverEnding Story III".

Weekly charts

References 

1994 albums
Snap! albums